Tuscaloosa Academy (TA) is a private school in Tuscaloosa, Alabama. It serves 452 students and has been described as a segregation academy.

History

The school opened with grades one through seven in September 1967, the year Alabama public schools were forced to desegregate. In 1973, the first graduation exercises were held. In a 1979 interview, headmaster William Garrison denied that it was founded as a segregation academy, as did all other private schools in Tuscaloosa, and said the school was "actively recruiting for blacks".  However, in 2021, Headmaster Bryan Oliver gave an interview acknowledging that the school was indeed founded as a segregation academy.
In 2017, Tuscaloosa Academy serves students from preschool through 12th grade.

It was initially housed in the Northington Army Hospital, in proximity to the University Mall, and had 113 students.  The property was state-owned, which stimulated protest by opponents.

In 2016, the school enrolled twelve black students (3%), in a community that is 47% black.

References

1967 establishments in Alabama
Educational institutions established in 1967
Education in Tuscaloosa, Alabama
High schools in Tuscaloosa, Alabama
Schools in Tuscaloosa County, Alabama
Private K-12 schools in Alabama
Segregation academies in Alabama